Firuzabad-e Kuchak (also Romanized as Fīrūzābād-e Kūchak and Fīrūzābād-e Kūchek; also known as Fīrūzābād) is a village in Kermajan Rural District, in the Central District of Kangavar County, Kermanshah Province, Iran. At the 2006 census, its population was 155, in 39 families.

References 

Populated places in Kangavar County